George Bruce Cunningham was a Scottish amateur football forward who played in the Scottish League for Queen's Park.

Personal life 
As of 1911, Cunningham was working as a clerk in a hide leather factory in Glasgow. Cunningham served as a private in the Royal Northumberland Fusiliers during the First World War.

Career statistics

References

1892 births
Scottish footballers
Scottish Football League players
British Army personnel of World War I
Royal Northumberland Fusiliers soldiers
Association football forwards
Queen's Park F.C. players
Date of death missing
People from Dennistoun
Clerks